Galatheanthemidae is a family of sea anemones belonging to the order Actiniaria.

Genera:
 Galatheanthemum Carlgren, 1956

References

Actiniaria
Cnidarian families